

Mark R. Cohen (born March 11, 1943) is an American scholar of Jewish history in the Muslim world.

Cohen is Khedouri A. Zilkha Professor Emeritus of Jewish Civilization in the Near East and Professor Emeritus of Near Eastern Studies at Princeton University.

He is a scholar of the history of Jews in the Middle Ages under Islam. His research relies greatly on documents from the Cairo Geniza. From 1985 until his retirement in 2013 Cohen also led the Geniza Lab at Princeton University, which aims to make the Geniza corpus available and searchable online (as of 2013, the database contained 4,320 documents). The project is headquartered at the S.D. Goitein Geniza Research Lab, where many of Goitein's personal books and notes are stored.

In 2014 Cohen was a visiting professor at New York University Abu Dhabi.

Cohen won the 1981 National Jewish Book Award in the Jewish History category for his book Jewish Self-Government in Medieval Egypt. He was awarded a Guggenheim Fellowship in 1996.

Cohen earned his undergraduate degree at Brandeis University, his master's degree at Columbia University, and his doctorate at the Jewish Theological Seminary.

Selected publications
Jewish Self-Government in Medieval Egypt: The Origins of the Office of Head of the Jews, ca. 1065-1126 (1981)
The Autobiography of a Seventeenth-Century Venetian Rabbi (1987)
Under Crescent and Cross: The Jews in the Middle Ages (1994)
Poverty and Charity in the Jewish Community of Medieval Egypt (2005)
''The Voice of the Poor in the Middle Ages:  An Anthology of Documents from the Cairo Geniza (2005)

See also

References

External links
Princeton University faculty page
Princeton Geniza Project
 Mark R. Cohen at Library of Congress Authorities — with 10 catalog records

1943 births
Living people
American Jews
21st-century American historians
21st-century American male writers
Brandeis University alumni
Place of birth missing (living people)
Princeton University faculty
Columbia University alumni
Jewish American academics
Jewish Theological Seminary of America alumni
Jewish American writers
Historians of Jews and Judaism
American historians of religion
American male non-fiction writers